Forter is a software as a service (SaaS) company that provides fraud prevention technology for online retailers and marketplaces. It has offices in Tel Aviv, London, Singapore, and New York; its headquarters are in New York.

History
The company was founded in 2014 by software engineers who formerly worked at Fraud Sciences, which was bought and integrated into PayPal in 2008. Before working at Fraud Sciences, the founders served in the Israeli Army's Intelligence unit.

Funding
Forter's funding includes a combined $100 million from Sequoia Capital, Scale Venture Partners, New Enterprise Associates, March Capital Partners, and Salesforce Ventures.

Technology
According to specialists, the challenge to online retailers seeking to prevent online fraud is to be able to assess the customer's trustworthiness in real-time without blocking a legitimate sale or delaying it so long the customer abandons the purchase. In its 2018 analysis of the online fraud detection and prevention, SaaS firms that included both established and newer firms (SAS and Feedzai, e.g.), Gartner Group categorized Forter's technology as fraud analytics. This includes behavioral analysis of customers' established shopping patterns, soft linking (the ability to trace relationships between users even when no overt information is shared) and other techniques. Forter offers clients the option of full restitution in the event of a chargeback.

See also
Chargeback fraud
Internet fraud prevention
EMV - Chip and PIN Credit Cards

References

Software companies established in 2013
Companies based in Tel Aviv
Providers of services to on-line companies
Computer security companies
Online companies of Israel

he:פורטר (חברה)